The Geometric Centre of Slovenia (GEOSS) is the geometric centre of the country. It lies in the hamlet of Spodnja Slivna near Vače in the Municipality of Litija. Since 4 July 1982, it has been marked with a memorial stone designed by the architect Marjan Božič, about 50m away from the given coordinates. A plaque reading Živimo in gospodarimo na svoji zemlji ('We live and prosper upon our land') was added on 14 September 1989. In 2003, Slovenia adopted an act on GEOSS.

References

External links 

 GEOSS homepage 
 Virtual panoramas, maps and aerial photography of the location
 Point GEOSS (Local Landmark). Map and description. Pespoti.si. 

Geography of Slovenia
Tourist attractions in Slovenia
Slovenia
Municipality of Litija